"Get Real" is a song by English singer Paul Rutherford, released in 1988 as the lead single from his debut solo album Oh World. A collaboration with ABC, the song was written by Rutherford, Martin Fry, Mark White and David Clayton, and produced by White and Fry. "Get Real" reached No. 47 in the UK and remained in the charts for four weeks. The song received an airplay ban by the BBC.

A music video was filmed to promote the single, which featured Rutherford in the Sonoran Desert. Speaking of the song to Melody Maker in 1989, Rutherford said: ""Get Real" was so off the wall, even with the whole Acid thing going on, there was something special about it. I knew no one would understand it, but Island said it was a definite Top 10 hit."

Critical reception
Upon release, Wee Papa Girl Rappers guest reviewed the song for Number One, with Sandra Lawrence commenting: "I'm quite into that acid music, it's good dance music but this one's a bit mellow, a bit commercial." Melody Maker described the song as a "slab of Acid for the radical dance faction, all squiggly synths and slithery bass." In 2004, FutureMusic described the song as "kind of like Giorgio Moroder meets Kraftwerk with a 303".

Track listing
7" single
 "Get Real" – 3:35
 "Happy Face" – 4:24

12" single
 "Get Real (Happy House Mix)" – 7:22
 "Get Real" – 3:35
 "Happy Face" – 4:24

12" single (UK "Sinister" release)
 "Get Real (Sinister)" – 6:31
 "Get Real (Don't Let 'Em Dub You Down)" – 6:33
 "Happy Face" – 4:24

12" single (UK "Hardcore" release)
 "Get Real (Hardcore)" – 9:28
 "Get Real" – 3:35
 "Happy Face" – 6:50

CD single
 "Get Real (Happy House Mix)" – 7:24
 "Get Real" – 3:35
 "Happy Face (Full Length)" – 6:50

Personnel
 Paul Rutherford - lead vocals, keyboards and programming on "Get Real"
 Beverley Skeete, Paul Lee, Lorenza Johnson - backing vocals on "Get Real"
 Derek Green - backing vocals and backing vocal arrangement on "Get Real"
 Dave Clayton - keyboards on "Get Real"
 Mark White - keyboards, producer and programming on "Get Real", producer of "Happy Face"
 Joe Dworniak - bass programming on "Get Real"
 Danny Cummings - percussion on "Get Real"
 Martin Fry - producer of "Get Real" and "Happy Face"
 Mark Stent - engineer on "Get Real"
 Jack Adams - mastering on "Get Real"

Charts

References

1988 songs
1988 singles
Island Records singles
Songs written by Martin Fry
Songs written by Mark White (musician)